John McGowan (born 17 April 1952) is a Scottish retired amateur footballer who played in the Scottish League for Queen's Park as a full back.

References 

Scottish footballers
Scottish Football League players
Queen's Park F.C. players
Association football fullbacks
Alumni of the University of Glasgow
Living people
Scotland amateur international footballers
Glasgow University F.C. players
1952 births
Footballers from Bellshill